Ernesto Jotti (born 5 March 1944) is an Italian racing cyclist. He rode in the 1970 Tour de France.

References

External links
 

1944 births
Living people
Italian male cyclists
Place of birth missing (living people)
Sportspeople from Parma
Cyclists from Emilia-Romagna